The 2017 Sydney Sevens was the fourteenth edition of the Australian Sevens tournament, the second of which to be held in Sydney, and the fourth tournament of the 2016–17 World Rugby Sevens Series. The tournament was played on 4–5 February 2017 at Allianz Stadium in Sydney, Australia.

Format
The teams were drawn into four pools of four teams each. Each team played all the others in their pool once. The top two teams from each pool advanced to the Cup quarter finals. The bottom two teams from each group advanced to the Challenge Trophy quarter finals.

Teams
The fifteen core teams were joined by Papua New Guinea, who qualified via the 2016 Oceania Sevens, for this tournament.

Pool stage

Pool A

Pool B

Pool C

Pool D

Knockout stage

13th place

Challenge Trophy

5th place

Cup

Tournament placings

Source: World Rugby (archived)

See also
 2017 Sydney Women's Sevens

References

Australian Sevens
2016–17 World Rugby Sevens Series
Sydney Sevens
Sports competitions in Sydney